Maxair may refer to:

 Pirbuterol, trade name for a pharmaceutical used in the treatment of asthma
 maXair (ride), a thrill ride at Cedar Point
 Maxair (aviation), a former Swedish airline
 Max Air, a Nigerian airline